Thinglabu     is a village development committee in the Himalayas of Taplejung District in  Province No. 1 of north-eastern Nepal. At the time of the 1991 Nepal census it had a population of 2744 people living in 526 individual households. Thinglabu VDC is around 6 km away from Phungling VDC

References

External links
UN map of the municipalities of Taplejung District

Populated places in Taplejung District